Yakup Kulmiy (7 September 1918, village of Kanakbaevo, Bashkortostan – 11 October 1994, village of Kanakaevo) was a Bashkir poet working under the pen name of Yakup Khairullovich Kulmukhametov.

He is the author of more than 20 books of poems: "Selected works" (1968), "The beauty of soul" (1971), "The sun of soul" (1990), "Lyrics" (1993) and others; and popular songs: "My motherland", "My Urals", "A nightingale" and others.

Being a participant in the second world war, he was awarded the Order of the Patriotic War 2nd class, and medals.
In 1958-1978, he worked in radio, in the wording of literary programs of the State Committee for Television and Radio Broadcasting Council of Ministers of the Bashkir Autonomous Republic.

Memory
In May 2013 in Kanakaevo was opened Park and a monument to (bust) dedicated to the memory of the poet.

External links
Biography

1918 births
1994 deaths
People from Ishimbaysky District
Bashkir people
Soviet poets
Soviet military personnel of World War II